USS LST-484 was an  built for the United States Navy during World War II. Like many of her class, she was not named and is properly referred to by her hull designation.

Construction
LST-484 was laid down on 28 September 1942, under Maritime Commission (MARCOM) contract, MC hull 1004, by  Kaiser Shipyards, Yard No. 4, Richmond, California; launched on 2 January 1943; and commissioned on 23 April 1943.

Service history 
During World War II, LST-484 was assigned to the Asiatic-Pacific Theater and participated in the following operations: Gilbert Islands operation November and December 1943; the Battle of Kwajalein in February 1944; the Battle of Eniwetok in February and March 1944; the Battle of Saipan June and July 1944; the Battle of Tinian in July 1944; and the Battle of Okinawa from March to June 1945.

Post-war service
Following the war, LST-484 performed occupation duty in the Far East from 8 January 1946, until 20 February 1946. Upon her return to the United States, she was decommissioned on 27 July 1946, and struck from the Navy list on 28 August 1946. On 13 December 1947, she was sold to Kaiser Steel, Seattle, Washington, and subsequently scrapped.

Awards
LST-484 earned five battle stars for World War II service.

Notes

Citations

Bibliography 

Online resources

External links

 

1943 ships
Ships built in Richmond, California
LST-1-class tank landing ships of the United States Navy
World War II amphibious warfare vessels of the United States